Joseph John Wiehl (January 30, 1910 – January 21, 1996) was a professional American football player for the Pittsburgh Pirates. He attended Washington & Jefferson College and Duquesne University.

Notes
 

1910 births
1996 deaths
Players of American football from Pennsylvania
Sportspeople from the Pittsburgh metropolitan area
Washington & Jefferson Presidents football players
Duquesne University alumni
Pittsburgh Pirates (football) players
People from Washington County, Pennsylvania